The Schneeberg is a mountain, 692.4 metres high, that marks the southernmost boundary point of the borough of Suhl in the German state of Thuringia.

The mountain is forested down to the valley in the south. Its southern mountainside belongs to the parish of Grub and Eichenberg, both small forest villages near Themar in the county of Hildburghausen. The Schneeberg is the highest point of the Little Thuringian Forest. A hiking trail runs over the wooded Schneeberg linking Dolmar to  the Rennsteig trail.

References 

Mountains under 1000 metres
Mountains of Thuringia
Thuringian Forest
Suhl
Hildburghausen (district)